}}

The 1994 Wisconsin gubernatorial election was held on November 8, 1994. In the midst of the Republican Revolution, incumbent Republican governor Tommy Thompson won the election with a landslide 67% of the vote, winning a third term as Governor of Wisconsin. Thompson won 71 of Wisconsin's 72 counties, only losing Menominee County. To date, this is the latest gubernatorial election in which Dane County (containing Wisconsin's capital of Madison), as well as Ashland, Bayfield, and Douglas counties voted for the Republican candidate.

Results

| colspan="6" style="text-align:center;background-color: #e9e9e9;"| General Election, November 8, 1994

References

1994 Wisconsin elections
Wisconsin gubernatorial elections
Wisconsin